Donalds may refer to:

Donald (hill), hills in the Scottish Lowlands over 2000 feet (609.6 m)
Donalds, South Carolina, a town in Abbeville County, South Carolina, United States
Andru Donalds, a musician
Byron Donalds (born 1978), American politician